Big Day, originally titled A Day in the Life, is an American television sitcom that first aired on ABC from November 28, 2006, to January 30, 2007. The series was co-produced by Josh Goldsmith and Cathy Yuspa and directed by Michael Spiller for Sony Pictures Television.

Originally, it was supposed to debut on October 5, 2006, along with Notes from the Underbelly, but ABC made a last-minute change in its schedule by moving Ugly Betty to Thursday, thus replacing both sitcoms whose "buzz" was not especially promising.

Big Day was broadcast on Tuesdays at 9:00/8:00c. The timeslot was to be filled by another new sitcom that had a better "buzz," The Knights of Prosperity, but ABC moved that program to Wednesdays to make Big Day a priority. According to the ratings, Big Day turned out to be a ratings disappointment.

When Big Day ended its first season on January 30, 2007, only 12 of the 13 produced episodes aired leaving the 13th episode, titled The $10,000 Check, unaired.

On May 15, 2007, ABC officially cancelled the show after the network announced their 2007–2008 fall schedule.

Synopsis
Big Day follows a major event in a couples' life: the wedding day, during the course of one day from all the characters' viewpoints.

All of these events and other obstacles Danny and Alice will have to face before they walk down the aisle and say "I Do", unless someone should stand up and ask why this couple should not marry. Danny worked as a Camp Counselor.

The story arc has similarities to the 2004–2006 BBC series The Worst Week of My Life, which has also been the subject of a FOX pilot (2005), and the CBS sitcom Worst Week (2008).

Cast and characters

Episodes

Nielsen ratings

International broadcasters

References

External links
 

American Broadcasting Company original programming
2006 American television series debuts
2007 American television series endings
2000s American single-camera sitcoms
English-language television shows
Television series by Sony Pictures Television
Wedding television shows